Jeff Logan  starred as a running back at  Hoover High School in North Canton, Ohio establishing numerous scoring records. Logan went to Ohio State University in 1974 and played on 2 Big Ten Conference Championship football teams. Logan backed up two-time Heisman Trophy winner Archie Griffin for two seasons and then started in 1976 and 1977, Co-Captain of the 1977 team.  He was awarded All Big 10 first team and Academic All-American honors.

Jeff Logan was the color analyst for the Ohio State Football radio network from 1999-2005 working with Terry Smith, currently the voice of the LA Angels of Anaheim.  Jeff currently serves as color analyst on CW Columbus "Thursday Night Lights" high school football telecasts.  He is a broadcast team member on the Best Buckeye Coverage" 610WTVN pre and post game for all Ohio State Football broadcasts. He is an accomplished amateur golfer.

Recognized in 2016 by the Ohio State Alumni Association with the Mershon Award for service to Ohio State.   Honored with the Ohio Gold by the Columbus Chapter of the National Football Foundation and College Hall of Fame.

Logan was one of the founding members of the "Logan Family Foundation" which holds a charity golf tournament every year, with proceeds being used for a variety of charitable organizations and causes that benefits children and families in Stark County, Columbus and Ashland, OH.

References

1956 births
Living people
People from North Canton, Ohio
American football running backs
Ohio State Buckeyes football players